Hartington is a small village in South Frontenac Township, located about 14.5 miles (23.3 km) north of Kingston, Ontario, Canada on Provincial Route 38 (previously Highway 38). It was formerly a stop on the Kingston and Pembroke Railway. It is notable as being close to the Holleford meteor crater.

Services 

The Ontario Provincial Police operate the Frontenac Detachment at 5282 Hinchinbrooke Rd.

Fire Hall #4, a part of South Frontenac Fire Services is located at 4808 Holleford Rd.

The Hartington Branch of the Kingston Frontenac Public Library is located at 5598 Rd 38.

Communities in Frontenac County